Ibrahim Sulley (born 6 July 2001) is a Ghanaian footballer who plays as an attacking midfielder for Albanian club Tirana. He rejoined his former club Great Olympics in July 2021.

References

External links
 

2001 births
Living people
Ghanaian footballers
Association football midfielders
Ghana Premier League players
Accra Great Olympics F.C. players
KF Tirana players
Kategoria Superiore players
Ghanaian expatriate footballers
Ghanaian expatriate sportspeople in Albania
Ghana under-20 international footballers
Ghana youth international footballers
Expatriate footballers in Albania
Footballers from Accra